The Hlobane Coal Mine Disaster occurred at the Hlobane Colliery, Natal on 12 September 1944. During drilling of a dyke in a coal seam, methane built up during the night due to insufficient ventilation in the mine.

The explosion was said to have been caused by a miner relighting his lamp. He was in charge of monitoring the methane levels and its high levels had extinguished his lamp. The explosion resulted in the deaths of 57 miners and six serious injuries.

References

Mining disasters in South Africa
Coal in South Africa
Mining in South Africa
1944 in South Africa 
1944 mining disasters
1944 disasters in South Africa